João Monteiro may refer to:

 João Monteiro (editor), Brazilian editor of Nature Medicine
 João Monteiro (table tennis) (born 1983), Portuguese table tennis player
 João Monteiro (footballer) (born 2001), Portuguese footballer